Terêna or Etelena is spoken by 15,000 Brazilians. The language has a dictionary and written grammar. Many Terena people have low Portuguese proficiency. It is spoken in Mato Grosso do Sul. 20% are literate in their language, 80% literate in Portuguese.

Terêna has an active–stative syntax and verb-object-subject as default word order.

Varieties
There were once four varieties, Kinikinao, Terena proper, Guaná, and Chané, which were sometimes considered to be separate languages (Aikhenvald 1999). Carvalho (2016) has since demonstrated that all four of them are the same language. Only Terena proper is still spoken.

Language contact
Terena originated in the Northwestern Chaco. As a result, many Northern Guaicuruan loanwords can be found in Terena.

There are also many Tupi-Guarani loanwords in Terena and other southern Arawakan languages.

Phonology

Consonants 

/w, ʃ, n, l/ may often be heard as [v, tʃ, ɲ, ʎ].

Vowels 

[ɨ] is heard as an allophone of /i/.

See also
Terena Sign Language

References

Arawakan languages
Indigenous languages of the South American Cone
Languages of Brazil